The DRG Class 89.0 was a goods train tank engine of standard design (see Einheitsdampflokomotive) built for the Deutsche Reichsbahn (DRG).

History
It was the smallest standard locomotive in service with the Reichsbahn. Whilst numbers 89 001 - 89 003 were supplied as saturated steam engines, the remaining seven were superheated locomotives. After the Second World War half the machines went to the Polish State Railway (PKP) and half to the East German Deutsche Reichsbahn (DR). The last engine 89 008 was taken out of service in 1968 at Dresden-Altstadt locomotive depot (Bahnbetriebswerk or Bw) and remains preserved in the Dresden Transport Museum as a heritage locomotive. Since 1992 the engine has been in the ownership of the Mecklenburg Railway Friends (Mecklenburgischen Eisenbahnfreunde) in Schwerin.

Although this engine was never in service with the Deutsche Bundesbahn, it is in the DB's transport directory.

Model railway 
A Z scale model of the Class 89.0 locomotive has been used as the symbol for this model track gauge.

There has also been a model by the firm of Märklin for decades in H0 scale. The DB variant of this model has no real prototype, however, because this engine was never in the DB's fleet.

See also
 List of DRG locomotives and railbuses

References 

 
 
 

89.0
0-6-0T locomotives
89
Henschel locomotives
Railway locomotives introduced in 1934
Berliner locomotives
Standard gauge locomotives of Germany
C n2t locomotives
C h2t locomotives
Shunting locomotives